The SMU Mustangs are an intercollegiate football team representing Southern Methodist University (SMU) in the Division I Football Bowl Subdivision (FBS) of the National Collegiate Athletic Association (NCAA). Since the 2013 college football season, the Mustangs compete in the American Athletic Conference. SMU began playing football in 1915 and has played their home games since 1999 at Gerald J. Ford Stadium on the SMU campus in University Park, Texas, an enclave of Dallas.

Key

Seasons

Notes

References
General
2011 SMU Football Factbook

Specific

SMU
SMU Mustangs football seasons
SMU Mustangs football seasons